Phil "Flip" Sanderson (born January 23, 1977 in Orangeville, Ontario) is a professional lacrosse player for the Toronto Rock in the National Lacrosse League and formerly of the Toronto Nationals of Major League Lacrosse. Sanderson is one of a number of Sandersons involved (or formerly involved) in the NLL, including his brother Nate and cousin Josh.

Phil was on the 1999 Rochester Knighthawks practice squad before being signed by the Albany Attack for the 2000 season.

On July 31, 2009, Sanderson was traded from the Buffalo Bandits to the Toronto Rock in exchange for Chris Driscoll.

Statistics

NLL
Reference:

References

1977 births
Buffalo Bandits players
Canadian lacrosse players
Living people
National Lacrosse League All-Stars
People from Orangeville, Ontario
Sportspeople from Ontario
Hamilton Nationals players
Toronto Rock players